Samuel Wako Wambuzi (January 23, 1931) is a Ugandan scholar and jurist who served three time as the Chief Justice of Uganda; from 1972 to 1975, 1979 to 1980 and 1986 to 2001.

Early life 
Wambuzi was born in Kaliro village, at Namalemba in the present day now known as Kamuli district, his mother Milyamu Naigaga died one year after Wambuzi was born and was raised by his stepmother.

He attended Makerere University College and Kabete Veterinary School, Wambuzi flanks in his examination mostly his final examination leading him not qualified in subject of profession but do excel other subject.

He was intermediated by the love of music at his youthful age, he was a village musician performed mostly in Bugembe, Namutumba, Kaliro and Busoga villages.

He has been a chief judge since before the coming of the military leader; Idi Amin, that was due to his ever-faithful commitment to justice and loyalty to his homeland. His lived his whole together with family in Kampala, Uganda.

Wambuzi spanned over 40 years in the career, he served as the acting director of public prosecutions and president of the East African Court of Appeal during his service.

Wambuzi recorded straight regarding the treatise event of the country in a shake to its cultural, political, military and legal core.

Red Pepper newspaper interrelations 
In 2015, Wambuzi sued Red Pepper newspaper to high court over a story published title Exposed; 100 most indebted personalities revealed. He was among the 100 listed personalities (tycoons) that the publications was struggling to pay off loan of a business an about Shs10bn that was gotten from a financial body to boast the GreenHill Academy, after the wordings from the story meant that in common with the 100 people that the Red Pepper newspaper was to serialized, according to Wambuzi.

In 2017, the court orders the newspaper to pay Wambuzi an amount of UGX 375M and extra UGX 50million for exemplary damages after the publication lost the case which was sought as general and exemplary damage for libel and for permanent injunction. This rulings was delivered by Justice Patricia Basaza Wasswa who ordered the Red Pepper newspaper to pay the Plaintiff for the general damage of libel and later in 2015 was granted the cost.

Personal life 
He was married to Gladys Wambuzi, the founder of Greenhill Academy in Kampala died of cancer, with her had 3 children; Maria, William and Samson. In 2008, he Marion Nakabuye Ddamulira at St. Paul's Cathedral, Namirembe.

Book 

 The odyssey of a judicial career in precarious times: my trials and triumphs as a three-time chief justice. Samuel William Wako Wambuzi, Cross House Books 2014. Book, Samuel William Wako Wambuzi, 
 The role of an advocate: speech by the Honourable Chief Justice S.W.W. Wambuzi 5th July, 1974 to the Uganda Law Society at the Law Development Centre. S W W Wambuzi. Uganda Law Society, Kampala, LDC Publishers, 1974. Wambuzi, S.W.W. Role of an advocate. , . N: At head of title: The Uganda Law Society.

Bibliography 

 
 The Odyssey of a Judicial Career in Precarious Times
 My Trials and Triumphs as a Three-Term Chief Justice of Uganda.
 The odyssey of a judicial career in precarious times: my trials and triumphs as a three-time Chief Justice of Uganda. S W W Wambuzi, UK, Christian House Books, 2014. Biography. Genre/Form: Biographies, History, Biography, Named Person: S W W Wambuzi. Biography. , .

References

Further reading

External links 

 
 
 
 
 

Ugandan judges
1931 births
Living people
People from Eastern Region, Uganda
Makerere University alumni
People from Kamuli District
Chief justices of Uganda
Justices of the Court of Appeal of Uganda